Sludy is a rural locality (a village) in Modenskoye Rural Settlement, Ustyuzhensky District, Vologda Oblast, Russia. The population was 226 as of 2002. There are 12 streets.

Geography 
Plotichye is the nearest rural locality.

References 

Rural localities in Ustyuzhensky District